Sinodendron is a genus of beetles belonging to the family Lucanidae.

The species of this genus are found in Europe, Western Asia and Northern America.

Species:
 Sinodendron cylindricum (Linnaeus, 1758) 
 Sinodendron persicum (Reitter, 1902)
 Sinodendron rugosum (Mannerheim, 1843)

References

Lucanidae
Lucanidae genera